Charleston is a city in north central Mississippi and one of the two county seats of Tallahatchie County, which is located on both sides of the Tallahatchie River. This city is located east of the river and its population was 2,193 at the 2010 census.

History
The original county seat, Old Tillatoba, was discovered to have a defective land title, so the seat was removed to Charleston in 1837.

The Charleston Female school, established in 1852, flourished for several years. The Tallahatchie Herald, a Democratic weekly newspaper, was established in 1892.  In 1901, the Charleston Bank was established.  By the early 1900s, Charleston had a brick courthouse and jail, three churches, schools, a Masonic hall, an Odd Fellows lodge, and two cotton gins.  Its leading agricultural staple was cotton.  The population in 1906 was 800.

In 1931, a magnitude 4.6 earthquake occurred in Charleston, the most powerful earthquake in Mississippi.

Geography
It is also situated on the northern end of the concurrency of Mississippi Highways 32 and 35.

The city's official nickname is "Gateway to the Delta".

Demographics

2020 census

As of the 2020 United States Census, there were 1,884 people, 792 households, and 514 families residing in the city.

2000 census
As of the census of 2000, there were 2,198 people, 848 households, and 569 families residing in the city. The population density was 1,612.7 people per square mile (624.0/km2). There were 933 housing units at an average density of 684.6 per square mile (264.9/km2). The racial makeup of the city was 39.26% White, 59.69% African American, 0.36% Asian, 0.05% from other races, and 0.64% from two or more races. Hispanic or Latino of any race were 1.55% of the population.

There were 848 households, out of which 29.5% had children under the age of 18 living with them, 33.5% were married couples living together, 28.4% had a female householder with no husband present, and 32.8% were non-families. 31.0% of all households were made up of individuals, and 15.8% had someone living alone who was 65 years of age or older. The average household size was 2.51 and the average family size was 3.14.

In the city, the population was spread out, with 27.4% under the age of 18, 9.1% from 18 to 24, 25.2% from 25 to 44, 20.1% from 45 to 64, and 18.2% who were 65 years of age or older. The median age was 36 years. For every 100 females, there were 79.3 males. For every 100 females age 18 and over, there were 72.4 males.

The median income for a household in the city was $18,208, and the median income for a family was $24,750. Males had a median income of $26,500 versus $16,406 for females. The per capita income for the city was $10,835. About 30.7% of families and 34.4% of the population were below the poverty line, including 49.4% of those under age 18 and 29.1% of those age 65 or over.

Education
The City of Charleston is served by the East Tallahatchie School District. Before 1970, a dual system of schools, one for black students and another for whites was maintained. In 1970, the federal courts mandated in Alexander v. Holmes County Board of Education that the schools be integrated, and the school district adopted a plan by which classrooms remained segregated, but during the course of the school day entire classes of children and teachers were bused between East Tallahatchie High School and Allen Carver High School. The black students of Allen Carver protested, and the sheriff arrested 125 of them and sent them to the state penitentiary at Parchman. After intervention by the federal Community Relations Service, the students were allowed to reenter school and makeup missed exams. The classrooms were integrated, new elections were held for student government, and some black cheerleaders were added.

Charleston High School held its first racially integrated prom in April 2008. This event was the subject of the 2008 HBO documentary Prom Night in Mississippi. The documentary focused on Charleston High School and the efforts to have a mixed prom instead of the traditional racially segregated proms.

Strider Academy, near the city, closed in 2018.

Coahoma Community College is the designated community college.

Notable people
Eldra Buckley, running back for the NFL's Detroit Lions
Brad Dye, former lieutenant governor of Mississippi
Morgan Freeman, Academy Award-winning actor currently resides in Charleston
Mose Allison, blues singer and pianist
Jamie Whitten, congressman.

References

External links

Cities in Mississippi
Cities in Tallahatchie County, Mississippi
County seats in Mississippi